Rail Ka Dibba is a 1953 romantic drama Indian film directed by Prem Narayan Arora and starring Shammi Kapoor, Madhubala in lead roles.

The film was Shammi Kapoor's second release after Jeewan Jyoti (1953).

Plot 
Sundar (Shammi Kapoor) is a poor young man who makes living by being a human billboard. One day, walking at a sea shore near his living place, he sees a girl who is going to commit suicide by jumping in the sea. He tries to stop her and succeeds. She reveals herself to be Chanda (Madhubala), who is an orphan and does not have anyone in this world. She used to work as a maid in several families but was thrown out of work for this or that reason. With no one to care about her and no place to live, she has decided that suicide is the best option. Sundar takes her to his living place, which is an abandoned railway carriage which is near railway tracks. There she is introduced to Dr. Nirogi (Om Prakash), who was once a magician and showman, was thrown out of work and now lives with Sundar. There is Mohan (Sajjan), who is currently unemployed. Mohan tells her that he has come to Sundar's house just like Chanda was brought there. All four become friends and the carriage becomes a place of happiness for them. They share food and try to earn living by different means, not for themselves but for each other.

While Sundar, Nirogi and Chanda are still trying to find ways to make ends meet, Mohan arrives with good news that the newspaper Prakash Daily has hired him, at the sum of Rs 300 per month. Mohan has bought gifts for his friends with the advance he has received. To celebrate these happy times, they go out for a walk near a beach. In the evening when Nirogi and Mohan are out for some work, Chanda and Sundar realise that they are in love. Both of them marry soon but don't tell anything to their friends.

One day, Mohan tells Chanda that he is in love with her and wants to marry her. A horrified Chanda reveals that she is already married to Sundar and the result is Mohan begins fighting and abusing Sundar. Soon this verbal fight turns into a physical fight, with Chanda, in vain, trying to stop the men. Soon, Sundar knocks Mohan out and drags him to the railway track. What will happen now? Will these four unite again?

Cast
 Shammi Kapoor as Sundar
 Madhubala as Chanda
 Om Prakash as Dr. Nirogi
 Sajjan as Mohan
 Jayant as Pathan
 Ram Avtar as Newspaper Editor
 Cuckoo as Dancer
 Helen as Dancer

Soundtrack 
The music was composed by Ghulam Mohammed. Lyrics were penned by Shakeel Badayuni.

Reception

Critical reception 
Rail Ka Dibba received mixed reviews from the critics. A review by the Thought journal was not impressed with the way Madhubala was presented onscreen, but found Shammi Kapoor to be a "promising actor". The reviewer concluded, "All in all there is comedy and fun in abundance. The picture is a must watch."

Box office 
Rail Ka Dibba was a box office disappointment. It was the nineteenth highest-grossing Indian film of 1953, and remained Shammi Kapoor's highest-grossing release till Tumsa Nahin Dekha (1957).

References

External links 

1953 films
1950s Hindi-language films
Indian romantic drama films
1953 romantic drama films
Indian black-and-white films